BeritaSatu Sports is a sports television channel, which broadcasts since 2014. This channel is also useful as a dedicated channel for about the arena. This channel is upper-middle class. The owner and founder is Peter F. Gontha.

History 
BeritaSatu Sports was officially launched in 2014 as a sport channel, together with BeritaSatu World, and BeritaSatu English. In the beginning, the channel did not broadcast 24 hours per day. Later, BeritaSatu Sports aired for 24 hours. BeritaSatu Sports became a new member of BeritaSatu Media Holdings is owned by Lippo Group. Due to the 2015 Indonesia Super League season not being concluded.In 2017, BeritaSatu Sports is closed for public.

References

External links 
 Official web site

Sports television in Indonesia
Television stations in Indonesia
Television channels and stations established in 2014